Paul J. Schlise (born 1966) is a rear admiral in the United States Navy.

Personal life
Schlise is originally from Sturgeon Bay, Wisconsin. He received a civilian education at Marquette University, earning a bachelor's degree from the College of Business in 1989.

Naval career
Schlise was commissioned via the Naval Reserve Officers Training Corps at Marquette. His deployments include serving during the Gulf War, Operation Southern Watch, the 1998 Bombing of Iraq, Operation Enduring Freedom and Operation Tomodachi.

Schlise has been stationed at The Pentagon and graduated from the Naval War College in 2006 with a master's degree in national security and strategic studies. In 2017, he was named Deputy Commander of United States Naval Forces Central Command the United States Fifth Fleet. He became acting commander in December 2018, following the death of Vice Admiral Scott Stearney. He assumed command of Carrier Strike Group 10 in June 2019. Schlise was succeeded by Rear Admiral Brendan R. McLane in May 2020.

Schlise previously served as director of the Surface Warfare Division in the Office of the Chief of Naval Operations.  In October 2021, he was nominated for promotion to rear admiral and nominated as director of the Warfare Development Division, to which he was confirmed. He was assigned as director of the Warfare Integration Division in February 2023.

Schlise's awards include the Legion of Merit, the Defense Meritorious Service Medal, the Meritorious Service Medal with gold star, the Navy Commendation Medal with silver star and the Navy Achievement Medal with two gold stars.

References

1966 births
Living people
Place of birth missing (living people)
People from Sturgeon Bay, Wisconsin
Marquette University alumni
Military personnel from Wisconsin
United States Navy personnel of the Gulf War
Naval War College alumni
Recipients of the Legion of Merit
United States Navy rear admirals (upper half)